The Cracticinae, bellmagpies and allies, gathers together 12 species of mostly crow-like birds native to Australasia and nearby areas.

Historically, the cracticines – currawongs, Australian magpie and butcherbirds – were seen as a separate family Cracticidae and, according to the 2018 Cements List, they still are. With their 1985 DNA study, Sibley and Ahlquist recognised the close relationship between the woodswallows and the butcherbirds in 1985, and placed them in a Cracticini clade, now the family Artamidae. The two species of peltops were once placed with the monarch flycatchers but are now placed here.

The cracticines have large, straight bills and mostly black, white or grey plumage. All are omnivorous to some degree: the butcherbirds mostly eat meat; Australian magpies usually forage through short grass looking for worms and other small creatures; and currawongs are true omnivores, taking fruit, grain, meat, insects, eggs and nestlings. The female constructs bulky nests from sticks, and both parents help incubate the eggs and raise the young thereafter.

The cracticines, despite their fairly plain, utilitarian appearance, are highly intelligent and have extraordinarily beautiful songs of great subtlety. Particularly noteworthy are the pied butcherbird, the pied currawong and the Australian magpie.

Species of Cracticinae
Five genera are recognised. The Australian magpie is classified in its own genus Gymnorhina. A 2013 molecular study has shown it to be the sister taxon to the black butcherbird (Melloria quoyi).

 Subfamily Cracticinae:

A fossil right scapula (MNZ S41061) found at the Manuherikia River in Otago, New Zealand and dating from the Early to Middle Miocene (Awamoan to Lillburnian, 19-16 million years ago) represents a member of the Cracticinae.

Kurrartapu johnnguyeni was described from a proximal tarsometatarsus recovered from the Riversleigh site in Queensland. It is early Miocene in age and is closer to Strepera/Cracticus than to Peltops. The bird was likely similar in size to the extant black butcherbird.

References

External links

Bird subfamilies
Higher-level bird taxa restricted to the Australasia-Pacific region
Passeri
Taxa named by Jean-Charles Chenu
Taxa named by Marc Athanase Parfait Œillet des Murs